The Initial Training Group of the British Army is responsible for the content and delivery of non-infantry Phase 1 training. The group's headquarters are at Pirbright, Surrey, commanding 4 Army Training Regiments, 5 Army Training Units, the Army Foundation College in Harrogate, the Army School of Physical Training, and the ARITC Staff Leadership School. It is part of the Army Recruiting and Training Command, who are responsible for all recruiting and training prior to becoming a fully qualified soldier or officer.

The headquarters is commanded by a Brigadier, supported by a number of military and civilian staff.

Units
ITG is responsible for the Army Training Regiments (ATRs), which provide Phase 1 Training for the majority of the regiments and corps in the British Army.

Army Foundation College Harrogate – for soldiers aged between 16 and 17½
Army Training Regiment Winchester
Army Training Centre Pirbright
Army Training Regiment Grantham
Army School of Physical Training
ARITC Staff Leadership School

Training

Initial Training Group delivers Phase 1 training for Regular Soldier entry, known as the Common Military Syllabus, over a 14-week training course in the Army Training Centre Pirbright and Army Training Regiment Winchester.  The Army Foundation College, Harrogate is the only Junior Entry Phase 1 training establishment in the British Army and trains recruits ages 16 to  years old.  It offers a mix of military training, personal development and education.

Reserve training is delivered at the Regional Army Training Units, the Army Training Regiment, Grantham and at the Army Training Centre Pirbright.  All Reserve training locations teach everything an Army Reserve recruits needs to know to become an effective soldier and fulfil their role in the Army Reserve.

All courses are designed to develop the individual and team skills in a progressive manner, preparing recruits for their Initial Trade Training, where they learn the specific skills for their chosen Army trade.

See also
 Infantry Training Centre, Catterick

References

External links
Soldier Initial (Phase 1) Training at army.mod.uk

Borough of Guildford
Education in Surrey
Organisations based in Surrey
Training establishments of the British Army